Triangle Dome is a trachytic lava dome in northern British Columbia, Canada. It is thought to have formed in the Pleistocene period.

See also
List of volcanoes in Canada
List of Northern Cordilleran volcanoes
Volcanism of Canada
Volcanism of Western Canada

References

Volcanoes of British Columbia
Mountains of British Columbia
Pleistocene lava domes